Juan Jose Landaeta (born October 7, 1978) is a professional boxer from Venezuela.  Juan Jose fought for the World Boxing Association (WBA) light flyweight title and minimumweight title.  Also, Juan Jose won the WBA interim minimumweight title.

Notable Fights
W12 (UD) vs. Chana Porpaoin for interim WBA minimumweight title (2004-01-31)
D12 vs. Chana Porpaoin for interim WBA minimumweight title (2004-05-05)
L12 (SD) vs. Yutaka Niida for WBA minimumweight title (2004-10-30)
L12 (SD) vs. Koki Kameda for WBA light flyweight title (2006-08-02)
L12 (UD) vs. Koki Kameda for WBA light flyweight title (2006-12-20)
L12 (KO) vs. Ryoichi Taguchi for WBA light flyweight title (2016-04-27)

External links 
 

|-

Living people
Mini-flyweight boxers
World mini-flyweight boxing champions
1978 births
Venezuelan male boxers
People from Maturín